The Datsun DS series was introduced in 1950 as the replacement for the Datsun DA. It used Datsun's truck chassis, itself based on pre-war Datsun designs closely based on the Austin Seven. A more luxurious range with the same truck underpinnings, called the DB series, was sold in parallel.



Datsun DS

The Datsun DS (Datsun DS-1) was introduced in late 1949 or 1950 as the replacement for the Datsun DA. It was essentially a 4146 truck, but with more comfortable bodywork and a chrome grille similar to that of the Datsun 17T truck except the center strip was chromed instead of painted. The same engine was used, but was modified to produce . The DS was short-lived as the last one was produced in early 1951.

Datsun DS-2

The Datsun DS-2 was released in 1951 and was completely redesigned with modern styling (the front end resembled a scaled-down Willys Jeep). The DS-2 was based on the Datsun 5147 truck and the drivetrain was the same new 860 cc engine as used in the DB-2. The DS-2 and later DS models were marketed as a less expensive (and basic) alternative to the more upscale DB. The DS-2 was known in Japan as the "Square Dandy" thanks to its square and boxy Jeeplike styling; the DS-2 was replaced by the Datsun DS-4 in 1952.

Datsun DS-4

The Datsun DS-4 (the DS-3 designation was skipped) was released in 1952 and was the first four-door car (along with the DB-4) to have the Datsun name. The styling was a nightmare (it looked like five different cars put together). The drivetrain carried over from the DS-2, although the chassis was lengthened to enable a larger passenger compartment. The front doors were rear-hinged while the rear doors were front-hinged. The front end was similar to the DS-2 but with a different grille; the front of the hood spelled out "DATSUN" in individual chrome letters. The DS-4 was in production until late 1953, when it was replaced by the Datsun DS-5.

Datsun DS-5

The Datsun DS-5 entered production in February 1953 and was largely the same as the DS-4, with a new grille design and powered by the new 860cc Type 10 engine producing . The DS-5 was in production until mid-1954, when it was replaced by the completely redesigned Datsun DS-6.

Datsun DS-6

The Datsun DS-6 Convar (a portmanteau of "Convenient Car") was released in July 1954 and was more modern than the DS-4 and DS-5. The DS-6 was based on the DS-5 and used its drivetrain. The front-end was unique with a flat panel (with "DATSUN" in individual letters) between the hood opening and the grille, which was oval in shape and divided horizontally by the bumper bar. The trunk lid lifted up rather than folded down, while the earlier DS-series' front suicide doors were replaced with conventionally hinged units.

Hurried in development, the DS-6 was only in production until the end of the year, when it was replaced by the all new Datsun 110 which went on sale in January 1955. Aside from its unusual looks, the Convar was also rather heavy. The car underwent very little testing before going on sale: the bodywork was weak, particularly at the rear, while cast door hinges failed at a high rate, leading to a multitude of customer complaints. Nissan, already far along with development of the all-new 110, did not have the resources to remedy the Convar's problems and in the end only about 500 cars were built.

References

 1950 Datsun DS
 1951 Datsun DS-2
 1952 Datsun Thrift DS-4
 1953 Datsun Thrift DS-5

Datsun vehicles
Cars introduced in 1950